Dmitriyevka is a rural locality (a village) in Nordovsky Selsoviet, Meleuzovsky District, Bashkortostan, Russia. The population was 356 as of 2010.

Geography 
It is located 32 km from Meleuz, 10 km from Nordovka.

References 

Rural localities in Meleuzovsky District